Caladenia graniticola, commonly known as the Pingaring spider orchid, is a species of orchid endemic to the south-west of Western Australia. It has a single, hairy leaf and one or two yellowish-green, red and white flowers which have a greenish-yellow and white labellum with a red tip. It was originally described as Caladenia hoffmanii subsp. graniticola but has a slightly different labellum and column.

Description
The flowers are yellowish-green, red and white and the lateral sepals and petals have narrow, club-like, glandular tips. The lateral sepals and petals spread widely and curve downwards. The tip of the labellum turns downward but is not rolled under as in some other caladenias. Flowering from late September to October.

Taxonomy and naming
The Pingaring spider orchid was first described in 2001 by Stephen Hopper and Andrew Phillip Brown from a specimen collected near Pingaring, after a specimen was first discovered by Kathleen White in 1984. It was given the name Caladenia hoffmanii subsp. graniticola and the description was published in Nuytsia. In 2007, the same authors raised it to species status. The specific epithet (graniticola)  is derived from the Latin word graniticus meaning 'granite rocks' and -cola meaning 'dweller', referring to the habitat preference of this species.

Distribution and habitat
Pingaring spider orchid occurs between Kalgarin and Newdegate in the Esperance Plains and Mallee biogeographic regions where it grows under tall shrubs on and around granite outcrops.

Conservation
Caladenia graniticola is classified as "Threatened Flora (Declared Rare Flora — Extant)" by the Western Australian Government Department of Parks and Wildlife. The main threats to the species are its small population size, inappropriate fire regimes, grazing by rabbits and kangaroos and weed invasion.

References

graniticola
Orchids of Western Australia
Endemic orchids of Australia
Plants described in 2001
Endemic flora of Western Australia
Taxa named by Stephen Hopper
Taxa named by Andrew Phillip Brown